Tripp Lake is a lake in Hubbard County, Minnesota.

Tripp Lake was named after Charles Tripp, a pioneer who settled there.

See also
List of lakes in Minnesota

References

Lakes of Minnesota
Lakes of Hubbard County, Minnesota